In molecular biology, the YjeF N terminal is a protein domain found in the N-terminal of the protein, EDC3. The YjeF N-terminal domains occur either as single proteins or fusions with other domains and are commonly associated with enzymes. They help assemble the processing body (P-body) in preparation for mRNAdecay. Structural homology indicated it may have some similarity to the enzyme family, hydrolase.

Function

At the cellular level, the YjeF-N terminal domain is vital to the assembly of the processing body (P-body). This aids mRNA decay and is thought to bring together different complexes to aggregate mRNPs. At the organism level, in bacteria and archaea, YjeF N-terminal domains are often fused to a YjeF C-terminal domain with high structural homology to the members of a ribokinase-like superfamily or belong to operons that encode enzymes of diverse functions. Examples of such include:
 pyridoxal phosphate biosynthetic protein PdxJ;
 phosphopanteine-protein transferase;
 ATP/GTP hydrolase;
 and pyruvate-formate lyase 1-activating enzyme.
In plants, the YjeF N-terminal domain is fused to a C-terminal putative pyridoxamine 5'-phosphate oxidase. In eukaryotes, proteins that consist of (Sm)-FDF-YjeF N-terminal domains may be involved in RNA processing.

Structure
The YjeF N-terminal domains represent a novel version of the Rossmann fold, one of the most common protein folds in nature. The YjeF N-terminal domain is a three-layer alpha-beta-alpha sandwich with a central beta-sheet surrounded by alpha helices. The conservation of the acidic residues in the predicted active site of the YjeF N-terminal domains shows some similarities to the amino acids found in the active sites of diverse hydrolases.

References

Protein families